The 2021 Eschborn–Frankfurt was a road cycling one-day race that took place on 19 September 2021 in the Frankfurt Rhein-Main metro area in southwest Germany. It was the 60th edition of Eschborn–Frankfurt, but only the 58th to be held, and the 27th event of the 2021 UCI World Tour. The race returned to the UCI World Tour calendar after the 2020 edition was cancelled due to the COVID-19 pandemic. Traditionally, the race takes place on 1 May, the Labour Day holiday in Germany, but it was postponed due to COVID-19 precautions.

It started in Eschborn, on the outskirts of Frankfurt. After entering Frankfurt and riding around most of the finishing circuit, the race traveled northwest through Oberursel into the Taunus to take on several hills. The riders then took on almost two laps of a larger circuit and almost four laps of a smaller circuit around Kronberg im Taunus, climbing the Ruppertshain twice and the Mammolshain four times. From there, the race passed through the start line in Eschborn again before finishing with almost three complete laps of a  technical circuit in Frankfurt near the Main River. In addition to the general classification, there was also a mountains classification, with points available at the top of each of the eight climbs, and three sprint points, each of which offered a monetary prize to the first rider across the line.

Teams 
13 of the 19 UCI WorldTeams and five UCI ProTeams made up the twenty teams that participated in the race. , with six riders, was the only team to not enter a full squad of seven riders. In total, 139 riders started the race, of which 91 finished.

UCI WorldTeams

 
 
 
 
 
 
 
 
 
 
 
 
 

UCI ProTeams

Result

References

Sources

External links 
  

2021 in German sport
2021 UCI World Tour
September 2021 sports events in Germany
Cycling events postponed due to the COVID-19 pandemic